Cory Leslie (born October 24, 1989) is an American distance runner. He is sponsored by Nike and trains with the Furman Elite Track Club. Leslie competes primarily in the 1500 m and 3000m steeplechase, winning the bronze medal at the 2015 Pan American Games in the latter event.

Leslie was raised in Sandusky, Ohio and ran for the Ohio State Buckeyes in college.

International competitions

Domestic competitions

References 

Living people
1989 births
American male middle-distance runners
American male steeplechase runners
Sportspeople from Sandusky, Ohio
People from Sandusky, Ohio
Ohio State University alumni
Ohio State Buckeyes men's track and field athletes
Pan American Games bronze medalists for the United States
Athletes (track and field) at the 2015 Pan American Games
Pan American Games medalists in athletics (track and field)
Track and field athletes from Ohio
Medalists at the 2015 Pan American Games